The 1942 Jacksonville Naval Air Station Flyers football team represented the Jacksonville Naval Air Station during the 1942 college football season. The team compiled a 9–3 record and outscored opponents 232 to 76. The team was ranked No. 6 among the service teams in a poll of 91 sports writers conducted by the Associated Press.

The team's head coach was Hobbs Adams, who coached at Kansas State before the war. Key players included George McAfee (halfback, Chicago Bears), Ray Terrell (halfback, Ole Miss), George Faust (Minnesota), Bill Borcher (Oregon), Vic Fusia (Manhattan), and Bill Chipley. McAfee was selected as the right halfback on the 1942 All-Navy All-America football team.

Schedule

References

Jacksonville Naval Air Station
Jacksonville Naval Air Station Flyers football
Jacksonville Naval Air Station Flyers football